Michael Thomas Fischlin (born September 13, 1955) is a former professional baseball player. He played all or part of ten seasons in Major League Baseball between 1977 and 1987 for the Houston Astros (1977–78, 1980), Cleveland Indians (1981–85), New York Yankees (1986) and Atlanta Braves (1987), primarily as a backup shortstop and second baseman.

Fischlin played one game for the Houston Astros' 1980 National League West champion team. In a 10-season career, he was a .220 hitter (207-for-941) with three home runs and 68 RBI in 517 games, including 109 runs, 29 doubles, six triples, and 24 stolen bases.

He also spent nine seasons in the minor leagues spanning 1975–1988 and managed the Myrtle Beach Blue Jays of the South Atlantic League in the 1989 and 1990 seasons. He played from 1977 through 1980 with the Cardenales de Lara and Leones del Caracas of the Venezuelan Winter League.

Fischlin was, along with Bill Caudill, one of the first players represented by agent Scott Boras. He currently works for Boras as the vice president of the player development department.

References

External links
, or Retrosheet

1955 births
Atlanta Braves players
Baseball players from Sacramento, California
Cardenales de Lara players
Charleston Charlies players
Cleveland Indians players
Columbus Astros players
Cosumnes River Hawks baseball players
Fort Lauderdale Yankees players
Greenville Braves players
Houston Astros players
Leones del Caracas players
American expatriate baseball players in Venezuela
Living people
Major League Baseball infielders
Minor league baseball managers
New York Yankees players
Oneonta Yankees players
Richmond Braves players
Sacramento State Hornets baseball players
Tucson Toros players
West Haven Yankees players